The World Group was the highest level of Fed Cup competition in 2015.

Draw

First round

Canada vs Czech Republic

Italy vs France

Poland vs. Russia

Germany vs. Australia

Semifinals

Czech Republic vs. France

Russia vs. Germany

Final

Czech Republic vs. Russia

References 

World Group